Prince Sergei Georgievich Romanowsky, 8th Duke of Leuchtenberg (4 July 1890 – 7 January 1974) was the son of Prince George Maximilianovich Romanowsky, 6th Duke of Leuchtenberg and his second wife Princess Anastasia of Montenegro. He succeeded his half-brother Alexander Georgievich as Duke of Leuchtenberg from 1942 until his death.

Background and early life
Prince Sergei was born on 4 July 1890 in Peterhof, Russian Empire to George Maximilianovich, 6th Duke of Leuchtenberg and Princess Anastasia of Montenegro. Sergei was styled His Serene Highness from birth until 1899 when he was granted the style of His Highness. George's first wife, Duchess Therese Petrovna of Oldenburg, died in 1883, leaving a young son. Sergei's father remarried six years later, when he caught the attention of Princess Anastasia of Montenegro at her sister Milica's wedding. George and Anastasia soon married and produced two children, Sergei and Elena. Anastasia divorced her husband in 1906 in order to marry Grand Duke Nicholas Nikolaevich of Russia.

Later years
Sergei introduced Alexander Andreyevich Svechin to his step-father Grand Duke Nicholas Nikolaevich, who was known for his religiosity and interest in mysticism. Grand Duke Nicholas died in 1929, and Sergei attended his funeral along with his sister Princess Elena.

Sergei died 16 December 1974 in Rome and was buried in the non-Catholic cemetery for foreigners in Testaccio, Rome, Italy. He was the last Duke of Leuchtenberg (now living descendants of the Duke of Leuchtenberg are descended from a morganatic marriage, which is why they lost their dynastic status of the members of the Russian Imperial House and the right to the Bavarian ducal title and style).

Honours and arms

He received the following honours:
  Knight of the Order of St. Andrew, 1912
  Knight of the Order of St. Alexander Nevsky, 1912
  Knight of the Order of the White Eagle, 1912
  Knight of the Order of St. Anna, 1st Class, 1912; 4th Class, with inscription "for Valor", 19 January 1915
  Knight of the Order of St. Stanislaus, 1st Class, 1912
  Knight of the Order of St. Vladimir, 4th Class, with Swords and Bow, 5 March 1915
  Grand Cross of the Order of Danilo I of Montenegro
  Commemoration Medal for the Golden Jubilee of King Nicholas I of Montenegro

Ancestry

Notes

References

1890 births
1974 deaths
Sergei
8
Russian people of German descent
Russian people of French descent
Russian nobility
Russian monarchists
White Russian emigrants to Italy
Emigrants from the Russian Empire to Italy
Italian people of Russian descent
Recipients of the Order of the White Eagle (Russia)
Recipients of the Order of St. Anna, 1st class
Recipients of the Order of St. Vladimir, 4th class